Maximilian Felzmann (22 April 1894 – 8 June 1962) was an Austrian general (General of the Artillery) in the Wehrmacht during World War II, and a recipient of the Knight's Cross of the Iron Cross with Oak Leaves.

Awards and decorations 
 Iron Cross (1939) 2nd Class (18 May 1940) & 1st Class (27 July 1940)
 German Cross in Gold on 29 January 1942 as Oberst in Artillerie-Regiment 251
 Knight's Cross of the Iron Cross with Oak Leaves
 Knight's Cross on 28 November 1943 as Generalmajor and commander of 251. Infanterie-Division
 643rd Oak Leaves on 3 November 1944 as Generalleutnant and commander of Korpsabteilung E

References

Citations

Bibliography 

1894 births
1962 deaths
Austro-Hungarian military personnel of World War I
German Army generals of World War II
Generals of Artillery (Wehrmacht)
People from Svitavy
Recipients of the Gold German Cross
Recipients of the Knight's Cross of the Iron Cross with Oak Leaves